The following lists events that happened during 2006 in the Republic of Nauru.

Incumbents
 President: Ludwig Scotty

Events

June
 June 26 - A deal is revealed where Australia agreed to pay US$29 million to clean up corruption in Nauru in exchange for Nauru accepting refugees who attempt to enter Australia.

References

 
2000s in Nauru
Years of the 21st century in Nauru
Nauru
Nauru